Last Chance was a former unincorporated community along Henrys Fork  in Fremont County, Idaho, United States, near the city of Island Park. The site originally was promoted as the "last chance" resort for the next , hence the name.

Transportation
A U.S. Highway passes through the community, as did a former U.S. Highway:
 
 , until it was rerouted entirely out of the state of Idaho in 1981

In popular culture
 In season 2, episode 19 of the American television drama series Early Edition, after retiring from the Chicago Police Department, the character Detective Crumb moves to Last Chance, Idaho.

See also

 Flat Rock, Idaho
 Lake, Idaho
 Staley Springs, Idaho

References

Unincorporated communities in Fremont County, Idaho
Unincorporated communities in Idaho
Island Park, Idaho
Rexburg, Idaho micropolitan area
Former populated places in Idaho